Shekarabad or Shokrabad or Shakrabad may refer to:
Shekarabad, Ardal, Chaharmahal and Bakhtiari Province
Shokrabad, Miankuh, Chaharmahal and Bakhtiari Province
Shokrabad, Fars
Shokrabad, Hormozgan
Shekarabad, Baft, Kerman Province
Shekarabad, Kuhbanan, Kerman Province
Shekarabad, Manujan, Kerman Province
Shokrabad, Khuzestan
Shokrabad, Kurdistan
Shekarabad, Delfan, Lorestan Province
Shekarabad, Dorud, Lorestan Province
Shekarabad, Selseleh, Lorestan Province
Shekarabad, Markazi
Shakrabad, Razavi Khorasan
Shokrabad, Tehran
Shokrabad-e Kavir, Tehran Province
Shokrabad, West Azerbaijan
Shokrabad, Zanjan

See also
Shukrabad (disambiguation)